Ankara's second electoral district is one of three divisions of Ankara province for the purpose of elections to Grand National Assembly of Turkey. It elects fifteen members of parliament (deputies) to represent the district for a four-year term by the D'Hondt method, a party-list proportional representation system.

Division
The first electoral district contains the following Ankara administrative districts (ilçe):

Altındağ
Ayaş
Beypazarı
Çamlıdere
Çubuk
Güdül
Kalecik
Kahramankazan
Keçiören
Kızılcahamam
Nallıhan
Pursaklar
Yenimahalle

Members

Population reviews of each electoral district are conducted before each general election, which can lead to certain districts being granted a smaller or greater number of parliamentary seats. Ankara's second district elected 14 MPs in 2002 and 2007. In 2011, this number increased to 15.

General elections

June 2015

2011

References 

Electoral districts of Turkey